Michelle Guthrie (born 1965) is an Australian business executive and lawyer.

Guthrie was born in Sydney in 1965, was educated at Brigidine College Randwick and Kambala Girls' School, and studied arts and law at the University of Sydney. She joined the law firm Allen, Allen & Hemsley as a media and technology lawyer in Sydney and Singapore, then moved to London as a corporate counsel for News International. She remained with the News Corporation group of companies for thirteen years, returning to Australia for an 18-month stint as director of legal and business development for Foxtel, then to Hong Kong to replace James Murdoch as the CEO of STAR TV. In 2007, she became managing director of Providence Equity Partners in Hong Kong. In 2011, she joined Google as managing director of partner business solutions, and later was managing director for agencies for the Asia-Pacific region, based in the company's Singapore office.

In December 2015, it was announced that Guthrie would become managing director of the Australian Broadcasting Corporation (ABC), replacing Mark Scott who retired in April 2016. Guthrie assumed the ABC position on 2 May 2016. She has been criticised for her lack of understanding of public broadcasting and journalism.

On 24 September 2018, ABC Chair Justin Milne announced that Guthrie had been sacked from the role of managing director of the ABC after the board of directors had concluded it was not in the best interests of the organisation for her to continue. After her dismissal, Guthrie took legal action against the ABC for unfair dismissal. In March 2019, Guthrie and the ABC reached a settlement on the matter, with Guthrie receiving $730,000 to drop the legal action.

Guthrie is married to Darren Farr, a chef and restaurateur who runs The LoKal restaurant in Singapore, and has two daughters.

References

1965 births
Living people
Australian chief executives
Managing directors of the Australian Broadcasting Corporation
Women television executives
Google employees
Australian women chief executives
Businesspeople from Sydney
Lawyers from Sydney
Australian women lawyers
Sydney Law School alumni
University of Sydney alumni
Australian people of Chinese descent
People educated at Kambala School